Pitot pressure is the pressure that is measured by a Pitot tube, an open-ended tube connected to a pressure-measuring device.  For subsonic flow, pitot pressure is equal to the stagnation pressure (or total pressure) of the flow, and hence the term pitot pressure is often used interchangeably with these other terms.  For supersonic flow, however, pitot pressure is the stagnation pressure of the flow behind the normal shock ahead of the pitot tube.  Pitot pressure is named for Henri Pitot, French scientist.

References

Pressure